In general topology, a branch of mathematics, a non-empty family A of subsets of a set  is said to have the finite intersection property (FIP) if the intersection over any finite subcollection of  is non-empty. Sets with the finite intersection property are also called centered systems and filter subbases.  

The finite intersection property can be used to reformulate topological compactness in terms of closed sets; this is its most prominent application.  Other applications include proving that certain perfect sets are uncountable, and the construction of ultrafilters.

Definition

Let  be a set and  a nonempty family of subsets of  that is,  is a subset of the power set of   Then  is said to have the finite intersection property if every nonempty finite subfamily has nonempty intersection; it is said to have the strong finite intersection property if that intersection is always infinite.  

In symbols,  has the FIP if, for any choice of a finite nonempty subset  of  there must exist a point   Likewise,  has the SFIP if, for every choice of such  there are infinitely many such   

In the study of filters, the common intersection of a family of sets is called a kernel, from much the same etymology as the sunflower.  Families with empty kernel are called free; those with nonempty kernel, fixed.

Families of examples and non-examples
The empty set cannot belong to any collection with the finite intersection property. 

A sufficient condition for the FIP intersection property is a nonempty kernel.  The converse is generally false, but holds for finite families; that is, if  is finite, then  has the finite intersection property if and only if it is fixed.

Pairwise intersection 
The finite intersection property is strictly stronger than pairwise intersection; the family  has pairwise intersections, but not the FIP.  

End-type constructions 
If  is a decreasing sequence of non-empty sets, then the family  has the finite intersection property (and is even a –system).  If the inclusions  are strict, then  admits the strong finite intersection property as well.   

More generally, any  that is totally ordered by inclusion has the FIP.   

Similarly, the family of intervals  also has the (S)FIP, but empty kernel.

"Generic" sets and properties 
If  is an infinite set, then the Fréchet filter (the family  has the FIP. All of these are free filters; they are upwards-closed and have empty infinitary intersection. 

Extension of the ground set 
The (strong) finite intersection property is a characteristic of the family  not the ground set   If a family  on the set  admits the (S)FIP and  then  is also a family on the set  with the FIP (resp. SFIP).

Generated filters and topologies 

But in general a filter's kernel need not be an element of the filter.   

A proper filter on a set has the finite intersection property. Every neighbourhood subbasis at a point in a topological space has the FIP, and the same is true of every neighbourhood basis and every neighbourhood filter at a point (because each is, in particular, also a neighbourhood subbasis).

Relationship to -systems and filters 

A –system is a non-empty family of sets that is closed under finite intersections.

For any family  the finite intersection property is equivalent to any of the following:

The  –system generated by  does not have the empty set as an element; that is, 
The set  has the finite intersection property.
The set  is a (proper) prefilter.
The family  is a subset of some (proper) prefilter.
The upward closure  is a (proper) filter on   In this case,  is called the filter on  generated by  because it is the minimal (with respect to ) filter on  that contains  as a subset.
 is a subset of some (proper) filter.

Applications

Compactness 
The finite intersection property is useful in formulating an alternative definition of compactness: 

This formulation of compactness is used in some proofs of Tychonoff's theorem.

Uncountability of perfect spaces 
Another common application is to prove that the real numbers are uncountable.  All the conditions in the statement of the theorem are necessary:
 We cannot eliminate the Hausdorff condition; a countable set (with at least two points) with the indiscrete topology is compact, has more than one point, and satisfies the property that no one point sets are open, but is not uncountable.
 We cannot eliminate the compactness condition, as the set of rational numbers shows.
 We cannot eliminate the condition that one point sets cannot be open, as any finite space with the discrete topology shows.

Ultrafilters 
Let  be non-empty,   having the finite intersection property. Then there exists an  ultrafilter (in ) such that   This result is known as the ultrafilter lemma.

See also

References

Notes

Citations

General sources
  
  
  
  
  
  
  
  
  
  (Provides an introductory review of filters in topology and in metric spaces.)

External links

 

General topology
Families of sets
Set theory